The Wilkes University Election Statistics Project is a free online resource documenting Pennsylvania political election results dating back to 1796.

Currently, the database documents Pennsylvania's county-level vote totals for President, Governor, United States Senator, and Congressional elections back to 1796. The database also contains directories for members of the Pennsylvania Provincial Assembly and the  Pennsylvania General Assembly, dating back to 1682.

According to the database's designer, Wilkes University Professor Harold E. Cox, "No other state has anything like it." The project's impetus began in 1996, when Cox inquired about 19th century election statistics, only to find that the data would cost $1,000.

The project has been cataloged by the Pennsylvania State University Libraries and the Van Pelt Library at the University of Pennsylvania. It has been cited as a source in academic books about the Supreme Court of the United States, Communist politicians in Pennsylvania, and a survey of state-level political parties.

See also
Elections in Pennsylvania

References

External links
Pennsylvania Election Statistics: 1682-2006 - The Wilkes University Election Statistics Project
Pennsylvania Election Statistics: 1682-2006 - Mirror site

Wilkes University
Politics of Pennsylvania
Online databases
Elections in the United States
Internet properties established in 1996
1996 establishments in Pennsylvania